Anna M. Valencia (born January 16, 1985) is an American politician who serves as the City Clerk of Chicago. She was appointed to the position vacated by Susana Mendoza, and took office in 2017. She was elected to a full term as City Clerk in 2019. Although unsuccessful in her run for Illinois Secretary of State in 2022, she won reelection to City Clerk in 2023.

Early life and education
Valencia was raised in Granite City, Illinois, the daughter of Joe and Debbie Valencia. She is of Mexican descent. She attended the University of Illinois Urbana-Champaign where she earned a Bachelor of Arts degree in International Studies.

Early political career
Valencia was a staff member for Mike Quigley's congressional election campaign in 2009 and for Michigan Representative Gary Peters's congressional election campaign in 2010. Valencia was a member of a Legislative Counsel and Government Affairs team for Chicago Mayor Rahm Emanuel in 2011 and later served as its director from April 2016 until January 2017. She was the campaign manager for Senator Dick Durbin in 2014. In 2015, she was a Senior Advisor for Chicago Mayor Rahm Emanuel’s re-election campaign.

City Clerk
She was appointed as City Clerk in December 2016, and was sworn into office on January 25, 2017.

She ran to continue her tenure as City Clerk in the 2019 election. After two challengers were removed from the ballot due to insufficient nominating petition signatures, she was unopposed and won election to a full term.

Municipal ID program 
In the fall of 2016, $1 million was set aside in the City Clerk's budget for Chicago's Municipal ID program which will allow all residents the ability to apply for a government-issued ID. Since taking office, Valencia has announced that the Municipal ID card will be a three-in-one card so that it can also be used as transit and library cards. In December 2017, Clerk Valencia announced the pilot program and that the card would be called the "CityKey" with the first 100,000 IDs being free.

2022 Secretary of State campaign
In June 2021, Valencia announced her candidacy for Illinois Secretary of State in the 2022 election to succeed longtime, outgoing incumbent Jesse White. Valencia has been endorsed by White, Governor J.B. Pritzker, and U.S. Senators Dick Durbin and Tammy Duckworth. On June 28, 2022, Valencia lost the Democratic primary to former state Treasurer Alexi Giannoulias.

Personal life
Valencia is married and lives in Chicago. On April 15, 2020, she gave birth to a daughter, Reyana Joy Valencia Kazmi.

References

External links

 Campaign website

1985 births
21st-century American politicians
21st-century American women politicians
City and town clerks
Hispanic and Latino American politicians
Hispanic and Latino American women in politics
Illinois Democrats
Living people
Mexican-American people in Illinois politics
People from Granite City, Illinois
Politicians from Chicago
University of Illinois Urbana-Champaign alumni
Women in Illinois politics